Atacadão is a Brazilian chain of warehouse stores. It was established by Alcides Parizotto and then became property of the Lima family and the executives Farid Curi and Herberto Uli Schmeil. In 2007, it was bought by Carrefour for R$2,2 billion Reais. In 2010, the company has 102 stores and 7 distribution centers in 26 Brazilian states. The company competes with Assaí Atacadista, now owned by GPA, Roldão and Makro. Atacadão also runs hypermarkets in 2012 to Colombia, Argentina and Morocco, where it is present along with its parent company Carrefour.

References

External links
 Brazilian official website
 Colombian official website

Carrefour
Retail companies of Brazil
Retail companies established in 1960